The DRU Cultuurfabriek (several spellings and versions; until December 2010: DRU-fabriek or Drufabriek) is the most important cultural centre of the municipality Oude IJsselstreek in the east of the Netherlands. The 'culture factory' in the northeast of the village Ulft is situated by the river Oude IJssel, Netherlands.

The basis for the centre are buildings of the former ironworks of Diepenbrock en Reigers te Ulft (DRU). The buildings are protected national monuments. The whole ensemble includes also the buildings of the Beltmancomplex with the highly visible water tower. These are used now as residences. Some of the buildings remain unused.

References

External links 

 Website (Dutch) 
 Website of the original company

Oude IJsselstreek
Cultural centers